The discography of Rufus Wainwright, a Canadian-American singer-songwriter, consists of seven studio albums, four live albums, three compilations, three extended plays (EPs), three video albums, nine singles, and nine music videos. Wainwright's self-titled debut album was released through DreamWorks Records in May 1998. Wainwright reached number 24 on Billboard's Top Heatseekers chart, and Rolling Stone named him 1998's Best New Artist. Wainwright's second album, Poses, was released through the same label in June 2001, resulting in a number one on the Heatseekers Chart and number 117 on the Billboard 200. With material recorded from the same session, Want One was released through DreamWorks in September 2003, and Want Two was released through Geffen Records in November 2004.

Wainwright's first EP, Waiting for a Want, was released through DreamWorks in June 2004, previewing songs that later appear on Want Two. His first music DVD, Live at the Fillmore, accompanied Want Two and features live concert footage from a March 2004 performance at The Fillmore in San Francisco, California. Wainwright's second EP, Alright, Already: Live in Montréal, was released by Geffen via iTunes in the United States and Canada on March 15, 2005. All I Want, released through Geffen in April 2005, contains various pieces of work, including a documentary (A Portrait of Rufus Wainwright), live performances, and music videos. Want, a repackaging of Want One and Want Two as one album, was released through DreamWorks/Geffen in November 2005, and contains two extra tracks.

Release the Stars, Wainwright's self-produced fifth studio album, was released through Geffen in May 2007. His most successful album to date, Release the Stars charted in 12 countries and was certified gold in both the United Kingdom and Canada. To promote the album, Tiergarten was distributed digitally and in limited vinyl format as Wainwright's third EP. Rufus Does Judy at Carnegie Hall became Wainwright's sixth album, a live recording released through Geffen in December 2007. The album earned Wainwright his first Grammy Award nomination, the 2009 award for Best Traditional Pop Vocal Album. Coinciding with the album, Rufus! Rufus! Rufus! Does Judy! Judy! Judy!: Live from the London Palladium is a DVD release of Wainwright's tribute concert to Judy Garland recorded in London during February 2007. Wainwright's August 27, 2007, performance at Pabst Theater in Milwaukee, Wisconsin was released in September 2009 as a live CD and video album titled Milwaukee at Last!!!. Wainwright's sixth studio album, All Days Are Nights: Songs for Lulu, was first released in Canada through Decca on March 23, 2010. House of Rufus, a career-spanning box set, was released on July 18, 2011. Wainwright's seventh studio album, Out of the Game was released in April 2012. In 2014, Wainwright released the compilation album Vibrate: The Best of Rufus Wainwright and live album Rufus Wainwright: Live from the Artists Den.

Albums

Studio albums

Live albums

Compilation albums

Extended plays

Singles

a Released in a 12-inch single format, limited to 500 copies; features the "Supermayer Lost in Tiergarten" remix

As featured performer

Video albums

Music videos

Note: Promotional music videos consisting of live concert footage exist for "Beautiful Child", "Hallelujah", "Vibrate", and "Want".

Other contributions

Soundtracks

Compilations

Guest appearances

See also
 Martha Wainwright discography

References

General
 
 
Specific

External links
Rufus Wainwright's official site
Rufus Wainwright at Geffen Records

Discographies of American artists
Discographies of Canadian artists
Pop music discographies
Discography